Gandaki Boarding School (Nepali: गण्डकी आवासीय विध्यालय), (often referred as GBS), formerly known as Nepal Adarsha Bidyashram, is a model boarding school of Nepal, established on 11 June 1966 in the city of Pokhara, 200 kilometers west of Kathmandu. It is the first and the only regional school of the country . It was established as a result of the initiation of three groups - The United Mission to Nepal, The Shining Hospital, and the local community.

History

Establishment
It was established in 1966 on the banks of Seti River in Lamachaur, Pokhara. Initially the facilities were primitive with all the thatch-roofed buildings mud and bamboo. There were 45 boarder students, who were catered for by five teaching staff. It was designated as a co-educational regional school in 1986 with English as the medium of instruction in an agreement between Nepal government and the United Mission to Nepal.

Until 1991, courses were available from Grade 4 to Grade 10. Then it started offering 10+2 system under the Higher Secondary Education Board. GBS is the first of few schools to introduce 10+2 in Nepal. Prior to the commencement of 10+2 education, students were prepared for GCE O' level study for a number of years.

In 1999 Gandaki College of Engineering and Sciences (GCES), is affiliated to Pokhara University and offers Bachelor of Engineering (BE) courses in Software Engineering.

From 2010, it offers GCE A' Level Course under the Cambridge University, Cambridge, England.

Landmarks
 11 June 1966 (30th Jestha, 2023): established as Nepali Adarsha Vidhyalaya for boys only.
 1985: Changed to English medium school and renamed to Gandaki Boarding School (GBS).
 1985: Recognized as the "Regional School" by the Government of Nepal.
 1985: Adopted co-education system by enrolling girls.
 1988: Gained a nationwide fame after Rajendra Gurung stood in SLC board first.
 1991: Celebrated its Silver Jubilee.
 1991: Started 10+2 in Science stream.
 1999: Started Gandaki College of Engineering and Sciences (GCES).
 2004: Awarded Birendra Vidhya National shield for SLC results with 4 boards, 66 distinctions, 100% first division among 113 candidates.
 2010: Started GCE-A Level studies under the University of Cambridge, England.

Notable alumni
 Amrit Gurung - singer, composer, musician, songwriter of Nepathya 
 Kiran Gurung - Politician; Minister of Economic Affairs and Planning at Gandaki Province
 Saru Bhakta - Litterateur; Former member of Nepal Academy of Music and Drama
 Sonie Rajbhandari  - Miss Nepal 2nd Runner Up 2014 A.D. (2071 B.S.)

Awards and recognition

 Birendra Regional Educational Shield (Western Region) for 19 years.
 Birendra National Educational Shield (Nepal) in 2004 (2060 B.S.).
 Board First, Rajendra Gurung, in 1988 (2045 B.S.) SLC Examination.
 Board Second, Third, Fifth, and Ninth in 2004 (2060 B.S.) SLC Examination.
 Ranked as one of the best schools of the country by "Himal" magazine, a Nepali journal.
 Ranked No. 1, by "Nepal" weekly magazine in 2001 in its evaluation of the best 10+2 schools of Nepal.
 Ranked in top 10, by "Nepal" weekly magazine in 2004 in its evaluation of the best 10+2 schools of Nepal. The magazine has, however, excluded GBS in its rankings in recent years. It cites, the fewer number of students GBS has compared to their criteria, as the reason.
 Ranked No. 2, by "Nepal" weekly Magazine in 2011 in its evaluation of the best schools of Nepal.
 Ranked No. 1, by "Nepal" weekly Magazine in 2012 in its evaluation of the best schools of Nepal.
 Ranked No. 1 by "Himal" in its evaluation in "Top Ten Plus 2 Colleges/HSS 2012/13:Outside Kathmandu Valley"

Scholarship Programme

GBS has 25% of students studying on a scholarship basis. The annual budget is around 10 million rupees, which is met from sponsoring agencies and individual donors. The major sponsoring donor agencies include FELM Finland, BMS UK, P.C of Ireland and some donors from USA and Australia. The Government of Nepal provides 1 million rupees annually through the Ministry of Education to support the scholarship program. A full scholarship costs 1400 USD per year. A partial scholarship is also awarded. Present scholarship incharge is Mr. Shreeram Adhikari

Scholarships are awarded to economically disadvantaged but intelligent students. The number of students studying on scholarship is 180.  They represent various ethnic groups and are from various districts of the country. Every year, during January/February scholarship entrance exams are conducted in eight centers across the Western Region of Nepal to select deserving students. Home visits are made to verify information and confirm the scholarship.

The scholarship program has been a part of GBS and GCES for many years. Through the program, the lives of  children from poor and disadvantaged families have been transformed.

Dr P.V Chandy GBS Scholarship Trust
Although the scholarship programme is continuing with the financial support of donor agencies, individual donors and the government of Nepal, it seemed imperative to open a trust in order to provide a strong financial security to the scholarship programme even after the UMN withdraws its support to the school. For this reason, Dr. P. V Chandy GBS Trust was established at the initiation of UMN expatriate Principal, Dr. P. V Chandy with the approval of the GBS Management committee and the United Mission to Nepal. The trust has been registered with the Government of Nepal, District Administration office, Kaski.

Dr. P. V Chandy is the chief patron of this trust, and a committee consisting of 10 members has been formed under the chairperson of EX. Rt Hon. Member of the Raj Parisad Standing Committee, Mr. Ganesh Bahdur Gurung. 48.5 million (4.85 crore) rupees has been raised and deposited at fixed accounts. Its mission is to raise the fund up to 10 million (10 crore) rupees so that the scholarship programme can continue to survive from the interest of the trust even after the withdrawal of the UMN's involvement.

Facilities and activities

Health Center
The health center takes care of minor illnesses and first aid services. Serious cases are referred to the bigger hospitals of Pokhara. A CMA counselor and a nurse remain in charge of the health center and of the health education classes.

Science Laboratories
The laboratories are for the science courses throughout classes 4 to 12. Each class have science practical classes in the science labs. In addition to the science teachers, the science department has three lab assistants who maintain the science apparatus and science facilities.

Hostels
There are ten hostels in GBS; seven for boys and three for girls. The hostels are named after the highest mountains of Nepal.

Library
The library was established in B.S. 2025. Set up in a simple building with limited resources, it now stands as one of the most well-equipped libraries in the western region and Nepal as well. It has more than 25,000 books including fiction, non-fiction,  and reference. The library subscribes to most of the notable newspapers and magazines published in Nepal, Audio Visual and open system library.

Library studies form a part of the school curriculum, in the course of which all students learn the positive use and exploitation of the library and its materials. Library projects are assessed as a component of the termly examination marks from grades 4 to 6.

Houses and annual competitions
Students are divided into four houses:

Seti (red)
Rapti (yellow)
Karnali (green)
Trishuli (blue)

The four houses compete in annual activities.

Annual Sports Day (athletics)
Inter-House sports competitions: football, volleyball, basketball, cricket (boys), rounders (girls), badminton, table tennis, soft tennis.
Inter-House academic competitions: general knowledge, essay writing (English and Nepali), speech (English and Nepali), debate(English and Nepali).

Other activities

GBS level basketball, football and cricket tournaments (annual)
Football, volleyball, and basketball competitions with outside teams.
Taking part in outside tournaments in football, essay writing, general knowledge, speech contest, essay writing competition, spelling contest, etc.

Club Activities
Gandaki Innovation Club
GBS MUN Club

Trivia

 The song "Kanchi Hai Kanchi" of Nepali movie Kanchhi was choreographed on the stage of Gymnasium Hall of GBS.
The movie A Mero Hajur 2 was also filmed inside GBS.

References

External links
 http://www.gbs.edu.np
 http://www.gces.edu.np

Boarding schools in Nepal
Cambridge schools in Nepal
Educational institutions established in 1966
Schools in Pokhara
1966 establishments in Nepal